Tiit Niilo (born 30 May 1962) is an Estonian politician. He was a member of X Riigikogu.

Early life
Niilo was born in Võru and graduated from the Estonian University of Life Sciences in 1986 with a degree in electrical engineering.

Career
Niilo ran in the spring 2003 Riigikogu elections in Võru, Valga and Põlva counties on the Res Publica Party ticket, collecting 787 votes. Niilo became a member of the Riigikogu in connection with the resignation of Hannes Võrno.

Personal life

Achievements and honours

References

1962 births
Living people
Isamaa politicians
Members of the Riigikogu, 2003–2007
Estonian University of Life Sciences alumni

People from Võru